Red-Tail Angels: The Story of the Tuskegee Airmen of World War II is a 1995 Children's picture book by Patricia and Frederick McKissack. It is about the African Americans of the 332nd Fighter Group and the 477th Bombardment Group of the USAF who were known as the Tuskegee Airmen.

Reception
A Horn Book Magazine review wrote "Here is a piece of history that needed to be told, and the McKissacks have told it superbly." and " Impeccably documented, handsomely designed, thoughtfully executed, this book by two of our most committed and talented writers gives these pioneers' accomplishments meaning for a new generation." The School Library Journal called it a "well-crafted, thoroughly researched account" and recommended it as "A lively, compelling addition to any collection."

Red-Tail Angels has also been reviewed by Kirkus Reviews,  Booklist, Publishers Weekly, and the American Book Review.

Awards
1996 ALA Best Book for Young Adults
1997 Carter G. Woodson Book Award - honor

References

1995 children's books
American children's books
Tuskegee Airmen
Books about African-American history
Children's history books
Books by Patricia McKissack